62 and 62b Cadogan Square is a Grade II* listed building in Cadogan Square, London SW1.

It was built in the British Queen Anne Revival style in 1883, and the architect was Richard Norman Shaw.

References

Grade II* listed buildings in the Royal Borough of Kensington and Chelsea
Grade II* listed houses in London
Houses completed in 1883
Houses in the Royal Borough of Kensington and Chelsea
Queen Anne architecture in the United Kingdom
Richard Norman Shaw buildings